Leland Diran Tomboulian (born January 8, 1960) is an American jazz pianist, accordionist, composer, arranger and educator.

Early life and career
Lee Tomboulian was born in White Plains into a music-loving family. He was the youngest of four children raised by Clyde Tomboulian and sculptor Norma Tomboulian. Lee Tomboulian displayed an affinity for music, and for the piano in particular, by age seven. He was encouraged in this pursuit with several years of private instruction. Tomboulian attended the University of Arkansas, majoring in music composition with a minor in theater arts. He continued to live and work in Arkansas for more than a decade. It was there that he met his wife, jazz singer Elizabeth (Betty) Elkins, in the late eighties.

In 1989 he formed the ensemble Circo Verde. The group was influenced in especially by the music of Brazil and Uruguay. A particular inspiration was Brazilian percussionist Airto Moreira's 1973 album Fingers, whose Uruguayan rhythm section would go on to form their own influential jazz fusion trio, Opa. One of Opa's founding members, Hugo Fattoruso, produced the debut recording of Tomboulian's self-described "pop-latin-jazz" ensemble more than a decade later.

In 1992, Tomboulian married Elizabeth Elkins. The following year, they departed Arkansas for Denton, Texas where Tomboulain would attend the University of North Texas as a graduate student. Tomboulain would earn a Master of Music in Jazz Studies in 1997.  While earning his degree, he performed and recorded with the university's One O'Clock Lab Band, appearing on the CD Lab '97. That album features the track, "B.B.", composed and arranged by Tomboulian.

At some point during the Tomboulians' 12-year stay in Denton, Circo Verde's name became simply Circo, the name under which its two albums were recorded.

In 2005, the Tomboulians moved to Wisconsin, where Lee served as Instructor of Jazz Piano and Improvisation at Lawrence University Conservatory of Music. He continued to serve in this capacity until 2011, when the couple again relocated, this time to New York City. Since then, Tomboulian has released a CD, Imaginarium with solo piano and overdubbed accordion.

omboulain

Discography

As le.dHe is er
 North/South Convergence (Circo Music, 2000)
 Return to Whenever (Lee Tomboulian, 2007)
 Imaginarium (Lee Tomboulian, 2012)

As sideman
With Kelly Franklin
 Labyrinth (Sidhe Records, 1993)
With Little Jack Melody and his Turks
 World of Fireworks (Carpe Diem, 1994), accordion, piano
With Trout Fishing in America
 Mine! (Trout Records, 1994), accordion, piano
 Who Are These People (Trout Records, 1994), accordion, organ
With Brian Moore
 The Signpost (Brian Moore, 1995)
With The One O'Clock Lab Band
 Lab '97 (North Texas Jazz, 1997)
With The Two O'Clock Jazz Band
 Two O'Clock Jazz Band (1997, Klavier Records), piano
 Moon River (1999, Klavier Records), piano
With Al Gibson
 It's About Time (Al Gibson Music, 1999)
With The UNT Jazz Repertory Ensemble
 Rockin' In Rhythm (North Texas Jazz, 1999, recorded in 1996) 
With Tony Hakim
 Summer Place (Grasshopper Records, 2000, rec. btw November 1997 and November 1999)
With Pete Brewer
 Second Wind (Pic Records, 2000), piano – track 3, part 2
With Mary Ellen Spann 
 Little Red Robin (China Alley Records, 2002)
With Susan Colin
 Shabbat Favorites (Lowell Music, 2003)
 Every Day: Songs of a Spiritual Life (Jewish Song Service, 2005)
With Faith to Faith
 Worship (Doxology, 2005), piano
With Colin Boyd
 Sincerity (Crystal Clear Sound, 2005), organ
With Lisa Perry
 Tropical Rose (Angel Rose Music, 2005)
With John Adams
 Trios (Congruent Music Co., 2006), keyboard, tracks 1, 7 & 8
With Wycliffe Gordon
 Jazz Celebration Weekend, November 11, 2006: Wycliffe Gordon (Lawrence University Conservatory of Music, 2006), piano
With Maria Schneider
 Jazz Series, June 1, 2007 (Lawrence University Conservatory of Music, 2007), accordion, track 4
With Stuart Dempster
 Stuart Dempster, trombone w[ith] Brian Pertl, didjeridu & Dane Richeson, percussion (Lawrence University Conservatory of Music, 2009), accordion
With Terrell Stafford 
 Terell Stafford, trumpet: w[ith] Jazz Faculty Trio (Lawrence University Conservatory of Music, 2011)

As arranger/composer
With The One O'Clock Lab Band
 Lab '97 (North Texas Jazz, 1997), composer – "B.B."
With Al Gibson
 It's About Time (Al Gibson Music, 1999), composer – "Rhoda Ribbon" and "Memory Gardens"
With The Lawrence University Conservatory of Music
 A Concert for Humanity (Lawrence University Conservatory of Music, 2006), composer – "Set for New Orleans" (disc 1, track 16)
 Hybrid Ensemble and Solo Jazz Singers in Concert (Lawrence University Conservatory of Music, 2009), arranger – "Louva-a-Deus" (Milton Nascimento)
 Just Jazz: Hybrid Ensemble (Lawrence University Conservatory of Music, 2010), arranger and lyricist – "Nothing Personal" (Don Grolnick)

References

Further reading
 "A Tomboulian New Years Eve". Arkansas Jazz Calendar: Arkansas Jazz Heritage Foundation Newsletter. Vol. 8, No. 4. December 2000. p. 4.
 "Live from the Circo Planet". Arkansas Jazz Calendar: Arkansas Jazz Heritage Foundation Newsletter. Vol. 9, No. 2. November 2001. p. 2.
 Peterson, Rick. "Grammy-winning Composer/Conductor Maria Schneider Closes Lawrence University Jazz Series". Blogs.Lawrence.edu. May 24, 2007.
 "Monday Jazz Project Features Pianist Lee Tomboulian: Jazz for Cats (Benefit for Feline Rescue and Rehome)". Arkansas Jazz Calendar: Arkansas Jazz Heritage Foundation Newsletter. Vol. 17, No. 2. July / August 2009. 
 Pertl, Brian. "Putting the Play Back into Playing Music". Blogs.Lawrence.edu. October 11, 2009. [Final two paragraphs.]
 Breeding, Lucinda. "Couple Returns for Sweetwater Gig". The Dallas Morning News. December 23, 2010.
 Tomboulian, Lee. "Take Five With Lee Tomboulian". All About Jazz. March 2, 2013.
 "Lee Tomboulian in Concert at the Downtown Site". New English Newsletter. June 9, 2013.

External links

Audio
 Interview on KUAF's "Ozarks At Large"

Video
 Youtube channel
 Elizabeth Tomboulian's Youtube channel

Text
 List of compositions at BMI
 Lee Tomboulian's jazz commentary & criticism (1989–1991) at Arkansas Jazz Heritage Foundation

Living people
1960 births
American jazz accordionists
American jazz composers
American male jazz composers
American jazz keyboardists
American jazz pianists
American male pianists
Latin jazz composers
Latin jazz keyboardists
Latin jazz pianists
Lawrence University faculty
University of North Texas College of Music alumni
20th-century American pianists
21st-century accordionists
21st-century American pianists
20th-century American male musicians
21st-century American male musicians